Anjireban Avareh Ali (also Romanized as Anjīrebān Āvāreh ʿAlī; also known as Anjīr Bānavāreh, Anjīrebān Āvāreh, Anjīrebānvāreh, Anjīreh-ye Bān Āvāreh, and Sarzal) is a village in Posht Tang Rural District, in the Central District of Sarpol-e Zahab County, Kermanshah Province, Iran. At the 2006 census, its population was 31, in 8 families.

References 

Populated places in Sarpol-e Zahab County